In Greek mythology, Phaenna ("the shining"), was one of the Charites (Graces).

The Lakedaemonians, say that the Charites are two, who gave them the names of Kleta and Phaenna. Her name means "Bright".

References

Beauty goddesses
Greek goddesses